Lithops hookeri is a species of plant in the genus Lithops, in the family Aizoaceae.

References

hookeri
Taxa named by Alwin Berger
Taxa named by Martin Heinrich Gustav Schwantes